Get Your Legs Broke  is the second album by Canadian alternative rock band Len, released in 1997.

Track listing

References

1997 albums
Len (band) albums